List of cyclist or cycling deaths (any kind) in U.S. by year

Cycling generally includes the riding of unicycles, tricycles, quadracycles, and similar human-powered transport (HPVs).  Note however that many HPV users are not considered cyclists, for example, using NHTSB statistics (US), skateboarder deaths are classified as pedestrians, yet it is unclear how Trikkes are classified.

The following table summarizes the number of people killed and/or injured in fatal cyclist collisions (as defined/reported by NHTSB) in the USA.  Statistics (generally) may vary based on the definition of what constitutes an injury or death, in particular time after incident and complications for deaths, and severity for injuries, therefore comparing statistics across years or nations requires a bit of deeper investigation.  Many injuries go unreported.  E-scooter deaths are being classified as pedestrians.

See also
 Transportation safety in the United States

References

Motor vehicle deaths in U.S. by year
Transport fatality rates